The 2015–16 Clemson Tigers men's basketball team represented Clemson University during the 2015–16 NCAA Division I men's basketball season. Led by sixth year head coach Brad Brownell, the Tigers played their home games at Bon Secours Wellness Arena, due to renovations at Littlejohn Coliseum, as members of the Atlantic Coast Conference. They finished the season 17–14, 10–8 in ACC play to finish in a tie for seventh place. They lost in the second round of the ACC tournament to Georgia Tech.

Last season
The Tigers finished the season 16–15, 8–10 in ACC play to finish in a three-way tie for sixth place. They lost in the second round of the ACC tournament to Florida State.

Departures

Incoming Transfers

Recruiting class

Roster

Schedule

|-
!colspan=12 style="background:#522D80; color:white;"| Exhibition

|-
!colspan=12 style="background:#522D80; color:white;"| Non-conference regular season

|-
!colspan=12 style="background:#522D80; color:white;"| ACC regular season

|-
!colspan=12 style="background:#522D80;"| ACC tournament

Clemson Tigers men's basketball seasons
Clemson